Chhapar is a small village in Jhajjar district in the state of Haryana, India.
It had a population of 2,878 among 567 households.

There is a temple of Shri Baba Ganga Das in Chhapar.

Language 
The native language of Chhapar is Haryanvi and most of the village people speak Haryanvi. People of Chhapar use Hindi and English languages for their official communications.

Transportation   
National Highway 71 is 7.4 km away from Chhapar. The nearest railway station is Machhrauli which lies on the Rewari-Rohtak line. Rewari Junction is the nearest major railway junction which is about 40 km away. The nearest airport is Indira Gandhi International Airport at New Delhi, 77 km away.

Education 
There are three schools functional in the village, Govt Senior Secondary School Chhapar, S D Senior Secondary School Chhapar and Gurukul Public School Chhapar. Jhajjar, Rohtak and Delhi are the nearby options for higher education.

Sports 
Naveen Kumar of Chhapar is an athlete who has represented India several times. He won bronze medal at the Asian Games 2014.

Wrestling and cricket are also popular games in Chhapar and there are many National level wrestlers in the village.

See also 
 Girdharpur, Jhajjar
 Khudan
 Neola, Jhajjar
 Sarola

References 

Villages in Jhajjar district